Arrhenotoides dubouzeti is a species of beetle in the family Cerambycidae, and the only species in the genus Arrhenotoides. It was described by Xavier Montrouzier in 1861.

References

Tmesisternini
Beetles described in 1861